San Fernando College is a Chilean high school located in San Fernando, Colchagua Province, Chile.

Gallery

References

External links

 San Fernando College 

Educational institutions established in 1984
Secondary schools in Chile
Schools in Colchagua Province
1984 establishments in Chile